Houry is a commune in the Aisne department in Hauts-de-France in northern France.

It may also refer to:

People
give name
Houry or Houri, Armenian feminine given name (in Armenian Հուրի)
Houry Gebeshian, Armenian-American artistic gymnast

middle name
Max-Gérard Houry Tannenbaum or Gérard Oury (1919–2006), French film director, actor and writer

surname
Houry, a French surname
Houry and Houri, an Arabic surname (In Arabic حوري and هوري) 
Adnan Houry or Adnan Houri (born 1955), Syrian athlete
Debra Houry, American physician
Hassan Houri (born 1985), Iranian footballer 
Henry Houry (1874–1972), French stage actor
Saad Houry (born 1952), Lebanese administrator. served as Deputy Executive Director of the United Nations Children's Fund (UNICEF)

See also
Houri, in Islamic religious belief, houris in plural, women who will accompany faithful Muslim believers in Paradise
Houri (disambiguation)
Hourya or Houria, disambiguation